The Wool Act 1699 (or the Woolens Act) was an Act of the Parliament of England (10 Will. 3. c. 16), long titled An Act to prevent the Exportation of Wool out of the Kingdoms of Ireland and England into Forreigne parts and for the Incouragement of the Woollen Manufactures in the Kingdom of England. It was intended to increase England's woolen product manufacturing by preventing Irish wool production, manufactures, and export; it also forbade the export of wool and products from the American colonies. Competing woolens from these areas had recently become more available in foreign and domestic markets. The Act prohibited American colonists from exporting wool and wool products, or export to markets outside the individual colony in which it was produced, or to be transported from one place to another in the same colony. The act did not forbid the making of woolen fabrics for private consumption, but simply forbade the making of woolens for the public market. At this time the woolens exported from England had to pay heavy export duties. The act, one of the Acts of Trade and Navigation, was mainly aimed at Irish woolens and established a policy to crush the Irish woolen industry. It had little effect on the American colonies; at most it only slowed the potential industry. Shopkeepers had a very hard time during this period when the Wool Act was in force. Some colonists opposed this act by buying more flax and hemp.

An exception to the act was passed the following year in the Exportation Act 1698 (11 Will. 3 c. 13 s. 9), which allowed these exports if they were for the use by the ship's crews and passengers. Later in the year however, duties were abolished for English exportation of manufactured woolens and other products by the Taxation Act 1698 (11 Will. 3 c. 20). The act was repealed by the Statute Law Revision Act 1867.

See also
 Burying in Woollen Acts

References

External links

1699 in law
Tax legislation in the United Kingdom
Acts of the Parliament of England
1699 in England
Taxation in England
Wool trade